Thomas Raymond Mason (born September 22, 1956) is an American football coach and former player. He served as the interim head football coach at Southern Methodist University (SMU) for the final 10 games of the 2014 season upon the resignation of June Jones, compiling a record of 1–9. Before that, he had been SMU's defensive coordinator since 2008.  Mason also served as the interim head football coach at Boise State University for the first ten games of the 1996 season, compiling a record of 1–9.

He most recently served as the linebackers coach for the XFL's Houston Roughnecks. Before the XFL, he was the linebackers coach of the Memphis Express of the Alliance of American Football (AAF).

Early life, playing career, and education
Mason was born in Montana in 1956.  He was a three-sport athlete at Walla Walla High School in Walla Walla, Washington, lettering in football, basketball, and track.  Mason played football as a linebacker and tight end.  He went on to play linebacker in college at the University of Nevada, Reno.  Mason earned a Bachelor of Science degree in physical education and later, while coaching at Eastern Washington University, earned a Master of Science degree in post-secondary education.

Coaching career
As a graduate student, then full-time coach, Mason began his college coaching career at Eastern Washington University, where he worked with linebackers and special teams.  He then joined head coach Pokey Allen as defensive coordinator at Portland State University, where the Vikings participated in the NCAA Division II playoffs in six out of seven years with two appearances in the national title game.  Following Allen to Boise State as defensive coordinator, Mason coached the 1994 Broncos to the NCAA Division I-A title game.  During Boise State's first year as a Division I football program, Mason served as Boise State's interim head coach for the first ten games of the 1996 season while Allen was on leave of absence battling with cancer.

Returning to his alma mater, the University of Nevada, Reno, Mason continued in the role as defensive coordinator.  After stints in the Canadian Football League with the BC Lions and the XFL, Mason returned to the collegiate level as linebackers coach at Fresno State University before returning to the role of defensive coordinator at SMU. After his interim head coaching tenure at SMU in 2014, he became the defensive coordinator at the University of Hawaii for the 2015 season but was reassigned to an administrative role before the end of the season.

In October 2018, Mason was named linebackers coach for the Memphis Express of the Alliance of American Football (AAF). The following year, he became linebackers coach for the XFL reboot's Houston Roughnecks.

After not coaching in the 2021 season, Mason joined Jim McElwain's staff at Central Michigan as the linebackers coach in January of 2022.

Head coaching record

Notes

References

1956 births
Living people
American football linebackers
BC Lions coaches
Boise State Broncos football coaches
Eastern Washington Eagles football coaches
Fresno State Bulldogs football coaches
Hawaii Rainbow Warriors football coaches
Nevada Wolf Pack football coaches
Nevada Wolf Pack football players
Northern Iowa Panthers football coaches
Portland State Vikings football coaches
Scottish Claymores coaches
SMU Mustangs football coaches
UTEP Miners football coaches
Las Vegas Outlaws (XFL) coaches
Junior college football coaches in the United States
Eastern Washington University alumni
Players of American football from Montana
Sportspeople from Walla Walla, Washington
Players of American football from Washington (state)
Memphis Express (American football) coaches
Houston Roughnecks coaches